Jacquelin Smith Cooley (July 24, 1883 – July 8, 1965) was a botanist and pathologist with an expertise in the study of fungi, lichen, and spermatophytes.

Cooley received an A.B. from Randolph-Macon College and M.S. from Virginia Polytechnic Institute. Cooley was awarded a Ph.D. from Washington University in St. Louis.

Cooley was a long-time member of the Botanical Society. Cooley was once a pathologist in the Bureau of Plant Industry with the U.S. Department of Agriculture in Washington, D.C. and worked there for 37 years, later retiring in 1951 (though Cooley continued to be active in botanical interests).

Research and publications 
 1922 Botanical Specimen
 1924 Botanical Specimen
 A Study of the Physiological Relations of Sclerotinia cinerea (Bon.)
 Control of Botrytis rot of pears with chemically treated wrappers
 Diseases of apples in storage
 Foliage diseases of the apple: Report on spraying experiments in 1910 and 1911
 Preventing black rot losses in sweet potatoes

References

External links



American women botanists
1883 births
1965 deaths
American phytopathologists
Women phytopathologists
United States Department of Agriculture people
Randolph–Macon College alumni
Virginia Tech alumni
Washington University in St. Louis alumni
20th-century American botanists
20th-century American women scientists